Oxyopes is a genus of lynx spiders found worldwide. It includes arounds 300 species and is classified under the lynx spider family Oxyopidae. Like other lynx spiders, they are easily recognizable by the six larger eyes arranged hexagonally on top of the head (prosoma), with the remaining smaller two eyes in front. They are also characterized by long spine-like bristles (setae) on their legs. They are ambush predators, actively hunting prey by sight. Though they produce and use silk, they do not build webs to capture prey.

The genus was first established in 1804 by the French zoologist Pierre André Latreille. The generic name means "keen-eyed", from Ancient Greek ὀξύς (oxús, "sharp") and ὤψ (ṓps, "eye").

Species

Species classified under Oxyopes (including subspecies) and their distribution ranges are the following:

 Oxyopes abebae Strand, 1906 — Ethiopia, East Africa
 Oxyopes acleistus Chamberlin, 1929 — USA, Mexico
 Oxyopes aculeatus Bösenberg & Lenz, 1895 — East Africa
 Oxyopes affinis Lessert, 1915 — East Africa
 Oxyopes africanus Strand, 1906 — Ethiopia
 Oxyopes aglossus Chamberlin, 1929 — USA
 Oxyopes akakensis Strand, 1906 — Ethiopia, East Africa
 Oxyopes albertianus Strand, 1913 — Congo, Uganda
 Oxyopes algerianus (Walckenaer, 1841) — Morocco, Algeria
 Oxyopes allectus Simon, 1910 — Gabon, Guinea-Bissau
 Oxyopes altifrons Mello-Leitão, 1941 — Brazil
 Oxyopes amoenus L. Koch, 1878 — Queensland
 Oxyopes angulitarsus Lessert, 1915 — Uganda
 Oxyopes annularis Yin, Zhang & Bao, 2003 — China
 Oxyopes annulipes Thorell, 1890 — Sumatra
 Oxyopes apollo Brady, 1964 — USA, Mexico
 Oxyopes arcuatus Yin, Zhang & Bao, 2003 — China
 Oxyopes argentosus Simon, 1910 — Guinea-Bissau
 Oxyopes argyrotrichius Mello-Leitão, 1929 — Brazil
 Oxyopes armatipalpis Strand, 1912 — India
 Oxyopes artemis Brady, 1969 — USA
 Oxyopes arushae Caporiacco, 1947 — East Africa
 Oxyopes ashae Gajbe, 1999 — India
 Oxyopes aspirasi Barrion & Litsinger, 1995 — Philippines
 Oxyopes assamensis Tikader, 1969 — India
 Oxyopes asterion Simon, 1910 — Guinea-Bissau
 Oxyopes attenuatus L. Koch, 1878 — Queensland, Central Australia
 Oxyopes auratus Thorell, 1890 — Singapore, Sumatra
 Oxyopes aureolus Thorell, 1899 — Cameroon
 Oxyopes auriculatus Lawrence, 1927 — Namibia
 Oxyopes azhari Butt & Beg, 2001 — Pakistan
 Oxyopes baccatus Simon, 1897 — Ethiopia
 Oxyopes badhyzicus Mikhailov & Fet, 1986 — Israel, Turkmenistan
 Oxyopes balteiformis Yin, Zhang & Bao, 2003 — China
 Oxyopes bantaengi Merian, 1911 — Sulawesi
 Oxyopes bedoti Lessert, 1915 — East Africa
 Oxyopes berlandorum Lessert, 1915 — East Africa
 Oxyopes bharatae Gajbe, 1999 — India
 Oxyopes bicorneus Zhang & Zhu, 2005 — China
 Oxyopes bifidus F. O. P.-Cambridge, 1902 — Mexico to Panama
 Oxyopes bifissus F. O. P.-Cambridge, 1902 — Mexico to Costa Rica
 Oxyopes biharensis Gajbe, 1999 — India
 Oxyopes birabeni Mello-Leitão, 1941 — Argentina
 Oxyopes birmanicus Thorell, 1887 — India, China to Sumatra
 Oxyopes bolivianus Tullgren, 1905 — Bolivia
 Oxyopes bonneti Lessert, 1933 — Angola
 Oxyopes boriensis Bodkhe & Vankhede, 2012 — India
 Oxyopes bothai Lessert, 1915 — Ethiopia, East Africa
 Oxyopes bouvieri Berland, 1922 — Ethiopia
 Oxyopes brachiatus Simon, 1910 — Equatorial Guinea, Bioko, Congo
 Oxyopes brevis Thorell, 1881 — Aru Islands
 Oxyopes caboverdensis Schmidt & Krause, 1994 — Cape Verde Islands
 Oxyopes calcaratus Schenkel, 1944 — Timor
 Oxyopes campestratus Simon, 1910 — Guinea-Bissau, Bioko, São Tomé
 Oxyopes campii Mushtaq & Qadar, 1999 — Pakistan
 Oxyopes camponis Strand, 1915 — Cameroon
 Oxyopes candidoi Garcia-Neto, 1995 — Brazil
 Oxyopes caporiaccoi Roewer, 1951 — Ethiopia
 Oxyopes carvalhoi Mello-Leitão, 1947 — Brazil
 Oxyopes castaneus Lawrence, 1927 — Namibia
 Oxyopes ceylonicus Karsch, 1891 — Sri Lanka
 Oxyopes chapini Lessert, 1927 — Congo
 Oxyopes chiapas Brady, 1975 — Mexico
 Oxyopes chittrae Tikader, 1965 — India
 Oxyopes coccineoventris Lessert, 1946 — Congo
 Oxyopes cochinchinensis (Walckenaer, 1837) — Vietnam
 Oxyopes complicatus Tang & Li, 2012 — China
 Oxyopes concolor Simon, 1877 — Philippines
 Oxyopes concoloratus Roewer, 1951 — Ethiopia
 Oxyopes constrictus Keyserling, 1891 — Brazil, Guyana
 Oxyopes cornifrons (Thorell, 1899) — Cameroon, Guinea-Bissau
 Oxyopes cornifrons avakubensis Lessert, 1927 — Congo
 Oxyopes cornutus F. O. P.-Cambridge, 1902 — Mexico
 Oxyopes cougar Brady, 1969 — USA
 Oxyopes crassus Schmidt & Krause, 1995 — Cape Verde Islands
 Oxyopes crewi Bryant, 1948 — Hispaniola
 Oxyopes daksina Sherriffs, 1955 — Sri Lanka, China
 Oxyopes decorosus Zhang & Zhu, 2005 — China
 Oxyopes delesserti Caporiacco, 1947 — Ethiopia, East Africa
 Oxyopes delmonteensis Barrion & Litsinger, 1995 — Philippines
 Oxyopes dingo Strand, 1913 — Central Australia
 Oxyopes dubourgi Simon, 1904 — Sudan, Congo
 Oxyopes dumonti (Vinson, 1863) — East Africa, Madagascar to Seychelles
 Oxyopes elegans L. Koch, 1878 — Queensland, New South Wales
 Oxyopes elifaz Levy, 2007 — Israel, Jordan
 Oxyopes elongatus Biswas et al., 1996 — India
 Oxyopes embriki Roewer, 1951 — Ethiopia
 Oxyopes embriki dorsivittatus Strand, 1906 — Ethiopia
 Oxyopes embriki nigriventris Strand, 1906 — Ethiopia
 Oxyopes erlangeri Strand, 1906 — Ethiopia
 Oxyopes exsiccatus Strand, 1907 — Java
 Oxyopes extensipes (Butler, 1876) — Rodriguez
 Oxyopes falcatus Zhang, Yang & Zhu, 2005 — China
 Oxyopes falconeri Lessert, 1915 — East Africa
 Oxyopes fallax Denis, 1955 — Niger
 Oxyopes felinus Brady, 1964 — USA, Mexico
 Oxyopes flavipalpis (Lucas, 1858) — West Africa, Ethiopia, Somalia
 Oxyopes flavus Banks, 1898 — Mexico to Costa Rica
 Oxyopes fluminensis Mello-Leitão, 1929 — Brazil
 Oxyopes forcipiformis Xie & Kim, 1996 — China
 Oxyopes fujianicus Song & Zhu, 1993 — China
 Oxyopes galla Caporiacco, 1941 — Ethiopia
 Oxyopes gaofengensis Zhang, Zhang & Kim, 2005 — China
 Oxyopes gemellus Thorell, 1891 — Nicobar Islands, Malaysia
 Oxyopes globifer Simon, 1876 — Mediterranean to Central Asia
 Oxyopes gossypae Mushtaq & Qadar, 1999 — Pakistan
 Oxyopes gracilipes (White, 1849) — Australia, Tasmania, New Zealand
 Oxyopes gratus L. Koch, 1878 — Queensland, Central Australia
 Oxyopes gujaratensis Gajbe, 1999 — India
 Oxyopes gurjanti Sadana & Gupta, 1995 — India
 Oxyopes gyirongensis Hu & Li, 1987 — China
 Oxyopes hastifer Simon, 1910 — Guinea-Bissau
 Oxyopes hemorrhous Mello-Leitão, 1929 — Brazil
 Oxyopes heterophthalmus (Latreille, 1804) — Palearctic
 Oxyopes hilaris Thorell, 1881 — Timor
 Oxyopes hindostanicus Pocock, 1901 — India, Pakistan, Sri Lanka
 Oxyopes hoggi Lessert, 1915 — East Africa, Angola
 Oxyopes holmbergi Soares & Camargo, 1948 — Brazil
 Oxyopes hostides Strand, 1906 — Ethiopia
 Oxyopes hotingchiehi Schenkel, 1963 — China
 Oxyopes hupingensis Bao & Yin, 2002 — China
 Oxyopes idoneus Simon, 1910 — Guinea-Bissau
 Oxyopes imbellis Thorell, 1890 — Malaysia
 Oxyopes incertus Mello-Leitão, 1929 — Peru, Brazil
 Oxyopes inconspicuus Strand, 1906 — Ethiopia
 Oxyopes indiculus Thorell, 1897 — Myanmar
 Oxyopes indicus (Walckenaer, 1805) — India
 Oxyopes infidelis Strand, 1906 — Ethiopia
 Oxyopes inversus Mello-Leitão, 1949 — Brazil
 Oxyopes iranicus Esyunin, Rad & Kamoneh, 2011 — Iran
 Oxyopes jabalpurensis Gajbe & Gajbe, 1999 — India
 Oxyopes jacksoni Lessert, 1915 — East Africa
 Oxyopes javanus Thorell, 1887 — India, China to Java, Philippines
 Oxyopes javanus nicobaricus Strand, 1907 — Nicobar Islands
 Oxyopes jianfeng Song, 1991 — China
 Oxyopes jubilans O. P.-Cambridge, 1885 — Karakorum, Pakistan, China
 Oxyopes juvencus Strand, 1907 — Sri Lanka
 Oxyopes kamalae Gajbe, 1999 — India
 Oxyopes ketani Gajbe & Gajbe, 1999 — India
 Oxyopes keyserlingi Thorell, 1881 — New Guinea
 Oxyopes kobrooricus Strand, 1911 — Aru Islands
 Oxyopes kochi Thorell, 1897 — Myanmar
 Oxyopes kohaensis Bodkhe & Vankhede, 2012 — India
 Oxyopes koreanus Paik, 1969 — Korea, Japan
 Oxyopes kovacsi Caporiacco, 1947 — Ethiopia
 Oxyopes kraepelinorum Bösenberg, 1895 — Canary Islands
 Oxyopes kumarae Biswas & Roy, 2005 — India
 Oxyopes kusumae Gajbe, 1999 — India
 Oxyopes lagarus Thorell, 1895 — Myanmar
 Oxyopes lautus L. Koch, 1878 — Queensland, Central Australia
 Oxyopes lenzi Strand, 1907 — South Africa
 Oxyopes lepidus (Blackwall, 1864) — India
 Oxyopes licenti Schenkel, 1953 — Russia, China, Korea, Japan
 Oxyopes lineatifemur Strand, 1906 — Ethiopia
 Oxyopes lineatipes (C. L. Koch, 1847) — China to Philippines, Sumatra, Java
 Oxyopes lineatus Latreille, 1806 — Palearctic
 Oxyopes lineatus occidentalis Kulczynski, 1907 — Italy
 Oxyopes longespina Caporiacco, 1940 — Ethiopia
 Oxyopes longetibiatus Caporiacco, 1941 — Ethiopia
 Oxyopes longinquus Thorell, 1891 — Myanmar, Nicobar Islands
 Oxyopes longipalpis Lessert, 1946 — Congo
 Oxyopes longispinosus Lawrence, 1938 — South Africa
 Oxyopes longispinus Saha & Raychaudhuri, 2003 — India
 Oxyopes ludhianaensis Sadana & Goel, 1995 — India
 Oxyopes luteoaculeatus Strand, 1906 — Ethiopia
 Oxyopes lynx Brady, 1964 — USA
 Oxyopes machuensis Mukhtar, 2013 — Pakistan
 Oxyopes macilentus L. Koch, 1878 — China to Australia
 Oxyopes macroscelides Mello-Leitão, 1929 — Brazil, Paraguay
 Oxyopes maripae Caporiacco, 1954 — French Guiana
 Oxyopes masculinus Caporiacco, 1954 — French Guiana
 Oxyopes mathias Strand, 1913 — Uganda
 Oxyopes matiensis Barrion & Litsinger, 1995 — Philippines
 Oxyopes mediterraneus Levy, 1999 — Mediterranean
 Oxyopes megalops Caporiacco, 1947 — East Africa
 Oxyopes m-fasciatus Piza, 1938 — Brazil
 Oxyopes minutus Biswas et al., 1996 — India
 Oxyopes mirabilis Zhang, Yang & Zhu, 2005 — China
 Oxyopes modestus Simon, 1876 — Congo
 Oxyopes molarius L. Koch, 1878 — Queensland
 Oxyopes naliniae Gajbe, 1999 — India
 Oxyopes nanulineatus Levy, 1999 — Israel
 Oxyopes nenilini Esyunin & Tuneva, 2009 — Uzbekistanm China
 Oxyopes nigripalpis Kulczynski, 1891 — Mediterranean
 Oxyopes nigrolineatus Mello-Leitão, 1941 — Argentina
 Oxyopes nilgiricus Sherriffs, 1955 — Sri Lanka
 Oxyopes ningxiaensis Tang & Song, 1990 — China
 Oxyopes niveosigillatus Mello-Leitão, 1945 — Argentina
 Oxyopes notivittatus Strand, 1906 — Ethiopia
 Oxyopes obscurifrons Simon, 1910 — São Tomé
 Oxyopes occidens Brady, 1964 — USA, Mexico
 Oxyopes ocelot Brady, 1975 — Mexico
 Oxyopes oranicola Strand, 1906 — Algeria
 Oxyopes ornatus (Blackwall, 1868) — Tropical Africa
 Oxyopes oryzae Mushtaq & Qadar, 1999 — Pakistan
 Oxyopes ovatus Biswas et al., 1996 — India
 Oxyopes pallidecoloratus Strand, 1906 — Ethiopia, Congo, East Africa, Madagascar
 Oxyopes pallidecoloratus nigricans Caporiacco, 1947 — East Africa
 Oxyopes pallidus (C. L. Koch, 1838) — West Indies
 Oxyopes palliventer Strand, 1911 — Aru Islands
 Oxyopes pandae Tikader, 1969 — India
 Oxyopes pankaji Gajbe & Gajbe, 2000 — India
 Oxyopes panther Brady, 1975 — USA, Mexico
 Oxyopes papuanus Thorell, 1881 — New Guinea, Solomon Islands, Queensland
 Oxyopes pardus Brady, 1964 — USA
 Oxyopes patalongensis Simon, 1901 — Malaysia
 Oxyopes pawani Gajbe, 1992 — India
 Oxyopes pennatus Schenkel, 1936 — China
 Oxyopes personatus Simon, 1896 — South Africa
 Oxyopes pigmentatus Simon, 1890 — Israel, Yemen
 Oxyopes pingasus Barrion & Litsinger, 1995 — Philippines
 Oxyopes positivus Roewer, 1961 — Senegal
 Oxyopes praedictus O. P.-Cambridge, 1885 — Yarkand
 Oxyopes providens Thorell, 1890 — Sumatra
 Oxyopes pugilator Mello-Leitão, 1929 — Brazil
 Oxyopes pulchellus (Lucas, 1858) — Congo
 Oxyopes punctatus L. Koch, 1878 — Queensland
 Oxyopes purpurissatus Simon, 1910 — Congo
 Oxyopes quadridentatus Thorell, 1895 — Myanmar
 Oxyopes quadrifasciatus L. Koch, 1878 — Queensland
 Oxyopes rajai Saha & Raychaudhuri, 2003 — India
 Oxyopes ramosus (Martini & Goeze, 1778) — Palearctic
 Oxyopes ratnae Tikader, 1970 — India
 Oxyopes raviensis Dyal, 1935 — Pakistan
 Oxyopes reddyi Majumder, 2004 — India
 Oxyopes reimoseri Caporiacco, 1947 — East Africa
 Oxyopes rejectus O. P.-Cambridge, 1885 — Yarkand
 Oxyopes reticulatus Biswas et al., 1996 — India
 Oxyopes rouxi Strand, 1911 — Aru Islands
 Oxyopes royi Roewer, 1961 — Senegal
 Oxyopes rubicundus L. Koch, 1878 — New South Wales
 Oxyopes rubriventer Caporiacco, 1941 — East Africa
 Oxyopes rubriventer paecilus Caporiacco, 1941 — Ethiopia
 Oxyopes rubrosignatus Keyserling, 1891 — Brazil
 Oxyopes rufisternis Pocock, 1901 — Sri Lanka
 Oxyopes rufovittatus Simon, 1886 — Senegal
 Oxyopes rukminiae Gajbe, 1999 — India
 Oxyopes russoi Caporiacco, 1940 — Somalia
 Oxyopes russulus Thorell, 1895 — Myanmar
 Oxyopes rutilius Simon, 1890 — Yemen, Socotra
 Oxyopes ruwenzoricus Strand, 1913 — Uganda
 Oxyopes ryvesi Pocock, 1901 — India, Pakistan
 Oxyopes saganus Bösenberg & Strand, 1906 — Japan
 Oxyopes sakuntalae Tikader, 1970 — India
 Oxyopes salticus Hentz, 1845 — USA to Brazil
 Oxyopes saradae Biswas & Roy, 2005 — India
 Oxyopes sataricus Kulkarni & Deshpande, 2012 — India
 Oxyopes scalaris Hentz, 1845 — North America
 Oxyopes schenkeli Lessert, 1927 — Congo
 Oxyopes sectus Mello-Leitão, 1929 — Brazil
 Oxyopes septumatus  Mukhtar, 2013 — Pakistan
 Oxyopes sertatoides Xie & Kim, 1996 — China
 Oxyopes sertatus L. Koch, 1878 — China, Korea, Taiwan, Japan
 Oxyopes setipes Thorell, 1890 — Borneo
 Oxyopes sexmaculatus Mello-Leitão, 1929 — Peru, Brazil
 Oxyopes shakilae Mukhtar, 2013 — Pakistan
 Oxyopes shweta Tikader, 1970 — India, China
 Oxyopes sinaiticus Levy, 1999 — Egypt
 Oxyopes singularis Lessert, 1927 — Congo
 Oxyopes sitae Tikader, 1970 — India, Andaman Islands
 Oxyopes sjostedti Lessert, 1915 — Ethiopia, East Africa
 Oxyopes sobrinus O. P.-Cambridge, 1872 — Libya, Israel
 Oxyopes squamosus Simon, 1886 — Senegal
 Oxyopes stephanurus Mello-Leitão, 1929 — Brazil
 Oxyopes sternimaculatus Strand, 1907 — South Africa
 Oxyopes strandi Caporiacco, 1939 — Ethiopia
 Oxyopes striagatus Song, 1991 — China
 Oxyopes striatus (Doleschall, 1857) — Myanmar to New Guinea
 Oxyopes subabebae Caporiacco, 1941 — Ethiopia
 Oxyopes subimali Biswas et al., 1996 — India
 Oxyopes subjavanus Strand, 1907 — Java
 Oxyopes submirabilis Tang & Li, 2012 — China
 Oxyopes summus Brady, 1975 — Costa Rica, Panama
 Oxyopes sunandae Tikader, 1970 — India
 Oxyopes sushilae Tikader, 1965 — India, China
 Oxyopes taeniatulus Roewer, 1955 — Brazil
 Oxyopes taeniatus Thorell, 1877 — Sumatra, Java, Sulawesi
 Oxyopes taiwanensis Lo, Cheng & Lin, 2021 — Taiwan
 Oxyopes takobius Andreeva & Tyschchenko, 1969 — Central Asia to China
 Oxyopes tapponiformis Strand, 1911 — Moluccas, New Guinea
 Oxyopes tenellus Song, 1991 — China
 Oxyopes tibialis F. O. P.-Cambridge, 1902 — Guatemala, El Salvador
 Oxyopes tiengianensis Barrion & Litsinger, 1995 — Vietnam
 Oxyopes tikaderi Biswas & Majumder, 1995 — India
 Oxyopes timorensis Schenkel, 1944 — Timor
 Oxyopes timorianus (Walckenaer, 1837) — Timor
 Oxyopes toschii Caporiacco, 1949 — Kenya
 Oxyopes travancoricola Strand, 1912 — India
 Oxyopes tridens Brady, 1964 — USA, Mexico
 Oxyopes tuberculatus Lessert, 1915 — East Africa
 Oxyopes tuberculatus mombensis Lessert, 1915 — East Africa
 Oxyopes ubensis Strand, 1906 — Ethiopia
 Oxyopes uncinatus Lessert, 1915 — East Africa
 Oxyopes vanderysti Lessert, 1946 — Congo
 Oxyopes variabilis L. Koch, 1878 — Queensland, Central Australia
 Oxyopes versicolor Thorell, 1887 — Myanmar
 Oxyopes vogelsangeri Lessert, 1946 — Congo
 Oxyopes wokamanus Strand, 1911 — Aru Islands
 Oxyopes wroughtoni Pocock, 1901 — India, Pakistan
 Oxyopes xinjiangensis Hu & Wu, 1989 — China
 Oxyopes zavattarii Caporiacco, 1939 — Ethiopia

See also
Peucetia

References

External links

Oxyopidae
Araneomorphae genera
Cosmopolitan spiders